Jan Niklas Patrik Sjöberg (born 5 January 1965) is a Swedish former high jumper. This mark is still the European record and ranks him third on the world all-time list behind Javier Sotomayor and Mutaz Essa Barshim. He is also a former two-time world indoor record holder with marks of 2.38 m (1985) and 2.41 m (1987). He is the 1987 World Champion and a three-time Olympic medallist.

Early life
Sjöberg was born in Gothenburg, Västra Götaland, and was a member of the Örgryte IS club.

Career
Sjöberg has a gold medal from the World Championships in Rome 1987 and has three Olympic medals: silver medals from Los Angeles 1984 and Barcelona 1992, and a bronze medal from Seoul 1988. Sjöberg is the only high jumper to have won medals in more than two Olympic Games. He won the 1985 World Indoor Games, is a four-time European Indoor champion and twice won the World Cup title.

Sjöberg received the Svenska Dagbladet Gold Medal in 1985. He has inspired many later Swedish high jumpers, most notably Kajsa Bergqvist, Linus Thörnblad, Staffan Strand, and Stefan Holm. His world record of 2.42 m was broken 15 months later, when, on the eve of the Seoul Summer Olympics, Javier Sotomayor jumped 2.43 m in September 1988 at a meet in Spain.

Sjöberg competed as a celebrity dancer in Let's Dance 2014, finishing fourth.

Sjöberg, who is a survivor of child sexual abuse, is co-founder of the website Dumpen.se. They chat with pedophiles and child groomers online posing as underage (under 15, the age of consent in Sweden) children. If the predator wants to meet the ”child”, Sjöberg and his associate Sara Nilsson travel to confront him, then post the chat logs and the video of their confrontation on the website.

Personal life
In his 2011 autobiography, Sjöberg revealed that he had been sexually molested as a child by his coach Viljo Nousiainen, a prominent Swedish athletics coach.

He has a daughter, Isabelle.

Competition record

1Representing Europe
2No mark in the final

References

Further reading

External links

Men's high jump records – IAAF

1965 births
Living people
Swedish male high jumpers
Olympic athletes of Sweden
Athletes (track and field) at the 1984 Summer Olympics
Athletes (track and field) at the 1988 Summer Olympics
Athletes (track and field) at the 1992 Summer Olympics
Olympic silver medalists for Sweden
Olympic bronze medalists for Sweden
World record setters in athletics (track and field)
Athletes from Gothenburg
World Athletics Championships medalists
Örgryte IS Friidrott athletes
Medalists at the 1992 Summer Olympics
Medalists at the 1988 Summer Olympics
Medalists at the 1984 Summer Olympics
Olympic silver medalists in athletics (track and field)
Olympic bronze medalists in athletics (track and field)
World Athletics Indoor Championships winners
World Athletics Indoor Championships medalists
World Athletics Championships winners